Hora Hori (Fight for Love) is a 2016 Indian Telugu-language romantic drama film written and directed by Teja, featuring Dileep, Daksha Nagarkar, Chaswa, and Aberaam Varma in the lead roles.

It was released on 10 September 2015 and received negative critics.

Cast 
Dileep Reddy as Skanda 
Daksha Nagarkar as Mythili 
Chaswa as Basawa
Aberaam Varma as Abhiram

References

External links 
 

2016 films
2010s Telugu-language films
Films directed by Teja (film director)
Films scored by Anoop Rubens
Indian political thriller films